Kodjo is both a surname and a given name. Notable people with the name include:

Surname:
Agbéyomé Kodjo (born 1954), Togolese politician and Prime Minister of Togo
Edem Kodjo (born 1938), Togolese politician and diplomat

Given name:
Kodjo (slave) (died 1833), Surinamese slave
Kodjo Afanou (born 1977), French footballer
Kodjo Akolor (born 1981), Swedish comedian
Kodjo Menan (born 1959), Togolese diplomat